Westville is a borough in Gloucester County, in the U.S. state of New Jersey. As of the 2020 United States census, the borough's population was 4,264, a decrease of 24 (−0.6%) from the 2010 census count of 4,288, which in turn reflected a decline of 212 (−4.7%) from the 4,500 counted in the 2000 census. Westville has been called "The Gateway to South Jersey!"

Westville was formed as a borough by an act of the New Jersey Legislature on April 7, 1914, from portions of Deptford Township and West Deptford Township, based on the results of a referendum held on April 28, 1914. The borough was reincorporated on March 8, 1924. Legislation had been passed in 1900 to create Westville, but it had to have a majority vote in favor of the new municipality in both Deptford and West Deptford. The borough was named for Thomas West, who built a home in the area in 1775 that still stands.

The borough had the 17th-highest property tax rate in New Jersey, with an equalized rate of 4.502% in 2020, compared to 3.212% in the county as a whole and a statewide average of 2.279%.

Geography
According to the U.S. Census Bureau, the borough had a total area of 1.38 square miles (3.58 km2), including 1.02 square miles (2.65 km2) of land and 0.36 square miles (0.93 km2) of water (25.94%). Unincorporated communities, localities and place names located partially or completely within the borough include Newbold, South Westville and Westville Manor.

The borough borders the municipalities of Deptford Township and West Deptford Township in Gloucester County, Bellmawr, Brooklawn, and Gloucester City in Camden County, and Philadelphia, located across the Delaware River in Pennsylvania.

Demographics

2010 census

The Census Bureau's 2006–2010 American Community Survey showed that (in 2010 inflation-adjusted dollars) median household income was $49,854 (with a margin of error of +/− $4,131) and the median family income was $65,089 (+/− $13,208). Males had a median income of $45,294 (+/− $5,957) versus $39,732 (+/− $7,921) for females. The per capita income for the borough was $26,908 (+/− $3,575). About 13.7% of families and 15.1% of the population were below the poverty line, including 22.7% of those under age 18 and 24.2% of those age 65 or over.

2000 census
As of the 2000 census, there were 4,500 people, 1,812 households, and 1,125 families residing in the borough. The racial makeup of the borough was 93.47% White, 2.71% Black, 0.13% Native American, 1.00% Asian, 0.02% Pacific Islander, 1.29% from other races, and 1.38% from two or more races. Hispanic or Latino of any race were 2.96% of the population.

There were 1,812 households, out of which 29.5% had children under the age of 18 living with them, 45.4% were married couples living together, 12.2% had a female householder with no husband present, and 37.9% were non-families. 31.8% of all households were made up of individuals, and 11.9% had someone living alone who was 65 years of age or older. The average household size was 2.48 and the average family size was 3.15.

In the borough, the age distribution of the population shows 24.5% under the age of 18, 8.0% from 18 to 24, 32.0% from 25 to 44, 21.5% from 45 to 64, and 14.1% who were 65 years of age or older. The median age was 37 years. For every 100 females, there were 94.2 males. For every 100 females age 18 and over, there were 91.4 males.

The median income for a household in the borough was $39,570, and the median income for a family was $49,005. Males had a median income of $35,909 versus $27,220 for females. The per capita income for the borough was $18,747. About 7.4% of families and 8.7% of the population were below the poverty line, including 13.9% of those under age 18 and 5.9% of those age 65 or over.

Government

Local government
Westville is governed under the Borough form of New Jersey municipal government, which is used in 218 municipalities (of the 564) statewide, making it the most common form of government in New Jersey. The governing body is comprised of a Mayor and a Borough Council, with all positions elected at-large on a partisan basis as part of the November general election. A Mayor is elected directly by the voters to a four-year term of office. The Borough Council is comprised of six members elected to serve three-year terms on a staggered basis, with two seats coming up for election each year in a three-year cycle. The Borough form of government used by Westville is a "weak mayor / strong council" government in which council members act as the legislative body with the mayor presiding at meetings and voting only in the event of a tie. The mayor can veto ordinances subject to an override by a two-thirds majority vote of the council. The mayor makes committee and liaison assignments for council members, and most appointments are made by the mayor with the advice and consent of the council.

, the Mayor of Westville is Democrat Fritz H. Sims Jr., who was appointed to serve an unexpired term of office ending December 31, 2022. Members of the Westville Borough Council are Council President Charles D. Murtaugh (D, 2023), Donna M. Domico (D, 2023), Travis Lawrence (D, 2022), Paul C. Mailley (D, 2022), Bruce Nordaby (D, 2024) and Tim Young (D, 2024).

In June 2020, Fritz H. Sims Jr. was appointed to fill the seat expiring in December 2022 that became vacant following the resignation of Russell W. Welsh Jr. after moving out of Westville.

Federal, state, and county representation
Westville is located in the 1st Congressional District and is part of New Jersey's 5th state legislative district.

Politics
As of March 2011, there were a total of 2,636 registered voters in Westville, of which 898 (34.1%) were registered as Democrats, 481 (18.2%) were registered as Republicans and 1,256 (47.6%) were registered as Unaffiliated. There was one voter registered to another party.

In the 2012 presidential election, Democrat Barack Obama received 57.2% of the vote (967 cast), ahead of Republican Mitt Romney with 40.5% (685 votes), and other candidates with 2.4% (40 votes), among the 1,711 ballots cast by the borough's 2,715 registered voters (19 ballots were spoiled), for a turnout of 63.0%. In the 2008 presidential election, Democrat Barack Obama received 57.0% of the vote (1,133 cast), ahead of Republican John McCain with 38.8% (770 votes) and other candidates with 2.5% (50 votes), among the 1,987 ballots cast by the borough's 2,854 registered voters, for a turnout of 69.6%. In the 2004 presidential election, Democrat John Kerry received 55.5% of the vote (1,044 ballots cast), outpolling Republican George W. Bush with 43.1% (812 votes) and other candidates with 0.7% (19 votes), among the 1,882 ballots cast by the borough's 2,623 registered voters, for a turnout percentage of 71.7.

In the 2013 gubernatorial election, Republican Chris Christie received 64.2% of the vote (602 cast), ahead of Democrat Barbara Buono with 32.4% (304 votes), and other candidates with 3.4% (32 votes), among the 961 ballots cast by the borough's 2,666 registered voters (23 ballots were spoiled), for a turnout of 36.0%. In the 2009 gubernatorial election, Republican Chris Christie received 45.0% of the vote (514 ballots cast), ahead of  Democrat Jon Corzine with 41.5% (473 votes), Independent Chris Daggett with 10.2% (116 votes) and other candidates with 0.9% (10 votes), among the 1,141 ballots cast by the borough's 2,759 registered voters, yielding a 41.4% turnout.

Education
The Westville School District is a community public school district that serves students in pre-kindergarten through sixth grade at Parkview Elementary School. As of the 2019–20 school year, the district, comprised of one school, had an enrollment of 361 students and 31.7 classroom teachers (on an FTE basis), for a student–teacher ratio of 11.4:1.

For seventh through twelfth grade, students attend Gateway Regional High School, a regional public high school serving students from the boroughs of National Park, Wenonah, Westville and Woodbury Heights, as part of the Gateway Regional High School District. As of the 2019–20 school year, the high school had an enrollment of 900 students and 79.0 classroom teachers (on an FTE basis), for a student–teacher ratio of 11.4:1.

Students from across the county are eligible to apply to attend Gloucester County Institute of Technology, a four-year high school in Deptford Township that provides technical and vocational education. As a public school, students do not pay tuition to attend the school.

Transportation

Roads and highways

County Route 551, Route 45, Route 47, U.S. Route 130, and Interstate 295 are the major roads that pass through the borough.

Public transportation
NJ Transit bus service on the 401 route between Salem and Philadelphia, the 402 between Pennsville Township and Philadelphia, the 408 between Millville and Philadelphia, the 410 between Bridgeton and Philadelphia, the 412 route between Sewell and Philadelphia, the 455 between Cherry Hill Mall and Paulsboro, and the 463 route between Woodbury and the Avandale Park-and-Ride in Sicklerville.

Conrai's Penns Grove Secondary freight rail line passes through the town. The planned diesel multiple unit light rail system, the Glassboro-Camden Line, would use the same right-of-way with a stop in Westville at Crown Point Road.

Notable people
Notable past and present residents of Westville include:

 George Anastasia (born 1947), expert on the American Mafia, author and journalist with The Philadelphia Inquirer
 Stephen Decatur (1779–1820), U.S. Navy officer recognized for heroism in the First Barbary War and the Second Barbary War and in the War of 1812
 Malcolm Fox (1906–1968), former professional race car driver
 Harold W. Hannold (1911–1995), politician who served in the New Jersey Senate from 1945 to 1959 and as Senate President in 1952
 James Hunter III (1916–1989), former United States Court of Appeals for the Third Circuit judge
 Maria Pallante (born 1964), United States Register of Copyrights
 Antwine Perez (born 1988), college football player
 Milt Plum (born 1935), professional football player with the Cleveland Browns (1957–1961), Detroit Lions (1962–1967), Los Angeles Rams (1968), and New York Giants (1969)
 Larry Sharpe (1951–2017), former professional wrestler

References

External links

 Official Westville website

 
1914 establishments in New Jersey
Borough form of New Jersey government
Boroughs in Gloucester County, New Jersey
New Jersey populated places on the Delaware River
Populated places established in 1914